Dahlak Kebir is the largest island of the Dahlak Archipelago. Situated in the Red Sea off of the coast of Eritrea, it was formerly called Dahlak Deset.

Overview
Dahlak Kebir has a population of around 2,500 people speaking the Dahalik language. Its major industries include fishing, sea cucumber collection and tourism.

The village of Dahlak Kebir lies on the west of the island and is known for its ancient cisterns and necropolis, dating from at least AD 912. It is also known for its fossils. Other features of the island include pre-Islamic ruins at Adel, wildlife and mangrove swamps. Ferries link the island with Massawa and several smaller islands.

References 

Dahlak Archipelago
Northern Red Sea Region
Islands of the Red Sea
Islands of Eritrea